Christophe de Saint Chamas is a Général de corps d'armée of the French Army and Commandant of the Foreign Legion.

Military career 

Saint-Cyrien of the promotion « Général Paul-Frédéric Rollet » (1978–1980).

Candidate of the 107th promotion of the superior course of the general staff headquarters, then the 2nd promotion of the Inter-arm Defense College, in addition, he is the auditor of the 55th session of the Center of High Military Studies and 58th session of the Institute of High Studies of National Defense between 2005 and 2006.

Cavalry officer, he served in the 12th Chasseurs Regiment at Sedan, then in the 1st Dragoon Regiment at Lure where he participated to the first Gulf War (Operation Daguet).

He was assigned to the Legion on three occasions.

In 1984, Chef de peloton then Captain at the 1st Foreign Cavalry Regiment 1er REC at Orange, he was engaged in exterior missions in Mayotte, Tchad and in the Central African Republic.

In 1995, Lieutenant-colonel and instruction operations bureau chief at the 1st Foreign Cavalry Regiment 1er REC, he was deployed to Tchad twice within the cadre of Operation Epervier and participated to the evacuation of French nationals from Condo Brazzaville in 1997 (Operation Pelican).

At the general staff headquarters of the Armies from 1997 to 2000, he took part to the planning and conduit of operations led in Bosnia and Herzegovina, in Kosovo and in Macedonia, at the corps of the crisis cell « Yougoslavie » of the inter-arm operational center.

He joined later the cabinet of the minister of defense and was accordingly promoted to rank of Colonel on 1 October 2000. He was entrusted for three years the functions of assistant of the Land Force contingent.

In 2003, Colonel regimental commander of the 1st Foreign Cavalry Regiment 1e REC until 2005, he commanded an inter-arm tactical group (GTIA) at the corps of Operation Licorne in the Republic of the Ivory Coast, from June to October 2004.

In 2006, he served in the Inter-arm Center of Experimentations for Concepts and Doctrines and became the planning assistant and chief of the J5 at the center of planning and operations conduit in June 2007.

Designated as Général de brigade on 1 August 2009, he was sent to Afghanistan as chief of the planning and strategy bureau (CJ5) of the general staff headquarters of the international assistance and security force (ISAF) at Kaboul from February 2010 to March 2011.

He assumed command of the Legion on 1 September 2011. He was designated as Général de division on 1 April 2013.

On 1 August 2014 général de Saint Chamas has been nominated as the officer general of Defense and Security Zone West and Commandant of region North-West as a Général de corps d'armée.

As of 1 July 2017, Général de corps d'armée de Saint-Chamas has been nominated as the Governor of Les Invalides.

In March 2022 he succeeded Bruno Dary as head of the Comité de la Flamme, overseeing the rekindling of the Eternal Flame at the Tomb of the Unknown Soldier.

Recognitions and Honors 

  Officier of the Légion d'honneur
  Commandeur de l'ordre national du Mérite
  Croix de guerre des théâtres d'opérations extérieures (1 star)
  Croix de la Valeur militaire (1 star)
  Croix du combatant
  Medaille d'Outre-Mer ( 4 agrafes-clasps )
  Médaille de la Défense nationale 
  Medaille de Reconnaissance de la Nation (d'Afrique du Nord)
  Médaille commémorative française
 2 decorations
  Kuwait Liberation Medal (Saudi Arabia)
  Kuwait Liberation Medal (Kuwait)
 2 decorations

References

Sources 
 Répertoire des chefs de corps
 Centre de documentation de la Légion étrangère
 Répertoire des citations (BCAAM)

1959 births
Living people
French generals
École Spéciale Militaire de Saint-Cyr alumni
Officers of the French Foreign Legion
Commandeurs of the Légion d'honneur
Commanders of the Ordre national du Mérite
Recipients of the Cross for Military Valour